Khvajeh Nezam-e Chahar Dang (also Romanized as Khvājeh Nez̧ām-e Chahār Dāng; also known as Khakenesun, Khāk Nezām, Khvājeh Nez̧ām, and Nez̧ām Vafā) is a village in Howmeh Rural District, in the Central District of Bam County, Kerman Province, Iran. At the 2006 census, its population was 203, in 49 families.

References 

Populated places in Bam County